Magic 98.3 may refer to:

 WMGQ (Magic 98.3), in New Brunswick, New Jersey
 CJMK-FM (Magic 98.3), in Saskatoon, Saskatchewan, Canada